The Criminal Justice Act 1925 (15 & 16 Geo.5 c.86) is an Act of the Parliament of the United Kingdom. Most of it has been repealed.

Section 36 of the Act makes it an offence to make a false statement to obtain a passport. The maximum sentence is two years.

Section 41 prohibits the taking of photographs in a court in England and Wales, save for the Supreme Court. In September 2011, Lord Chancellor Kenneth Clarke announced that the government intended to partially repeal this ban in order to increase the public's understanding of the administration of justice. Initially, filming of the handing down of judgments in the Court of Appeal was to be permitted, with a view that filming of sentencing remarks will eventually be permitted in the Crown Court. The first case of sentencing remarks being filmed in a Crown Court was on 28th July 2022 at the Old Bailey which saw sentence passed on Ben Oliver whom had been convicted of manslaughter. The broadcast was hosted on the Sky News YouTube channel with a 10 second delay to avoid breach of restrictions or errors.

Other provisions of the Act deal with criminal procedure against corporations, the defence of marital coercion (since abolished), and unlawful possession of pension documents.

References

External links 
 .

English criminal law
United Kingdom Acts of Parliament 1925